Sauroconcha caperteeana is a species of air-breathing land snails, terrestrial pulmonate gastropod molluscs in the family Camaenidae. The species was first described in 2008 by Weihong Zhang and Michael Shea. 

It is found in the Capertee Valley of New South Wales, in rocky outcrops where it lives, under and among rocks.

References

External links
Sauroconcha caperteeana Images & occurrence data from GBIF

Camaenidae